Honey Brook Township is a township in Chester County, Pennsylvania. The population was 8,274 at the time of the 2020 census.

Geography
The headwaters of the Brandywine River start in Honey Brook Township which is a part Brandywine River Tidal Basin. Honey Brook Township is also a part of the Pequea Creek Tidal Basin. Nearly two thirds of the land is in agricultural use.

Education
The school district is Twin Valley School District.

Honey Brook Elementary Center is in the township. Twin Valley Middle School and Twin Valley High School are in Caernarvon Township, Berks County, and have Elverson postal addresses.

Demographics

At the 2010 census, the township was 95.4% non-Hispanic White, 1.7% Hispanic or Latino, 1.1% Black or African American, 0.2% Asian, 0.1% Native Hawaiian or other Pacific Islander, and 3.2% were two or more races.

At the 2000 census there were 6,278 people, 2,054 households, and 1,554 families living in the township. The population density was 250.0 people per square mile (96.5/km). There were 2,134 housing units at an average density of 85.0/sq mi (32.8/km). The racial makeup of the township was 97.40% White, 1.08% African American, 0.99% Hispanic or Latino of any race, 0.24% Native American, 0.19% Asian, 0.03% Pacific Islander, 0.29% from other races, and 0.76% from two or more races.

There were 2,054 households, 38.7% had children under the age of 18 living with them, 63.5% were married couples living together, 7.8% had a female householder with no husband present, and 24.3% were non-families. 20.5% of households were made up of individuals, and 11.8% were one person aged 65 or older. The average household size was 2.90 and the average family size was 3.37.

The age distribution was 29.0% under the age of 18, 7.5% from 18 to 24, 27.5% from 25 to 44, 19.2% from 45 to 64, and 16.8% 65 or older. The median age was 36 years. For every 100 females, there were 90.7 males. For every 100 females age 18 and over, there were 83.8 males.

The median household income was $50,609 and the median family income was $57,500. Males had a median income of $40,970 versus $28,404 for females. The per capita income for the township was $19,046. About 5.2% of families and 6.8% of the population were below the poverty line, including 6.2% of those under age 18 and 19.5% of those age 65 or over.

Honey Brook Township is home to an Amish community, which comprises half of the township's population.

Transportation

A very short segment of the Pennsylvania Turnpike (I-76) crosses the northern tip of Honey Brook Township, but the closest interchange is at Interstate 176 and Pennsylvania Route 10 in neighboring Caernarvon Township. PA 10 heads southward across western portions of Honey Brook Township via Twin County Road and Compass Road. U.S. Route 322 follows Horseshoe Pike along a northwest-southeast alignment through the center of the township.

References

External links

 Honey Brook Township

Townships in Chester County, Pennsylvania
Townships in Pennsylvania